I Am Human is the sixth studio album by American rock band Escape the Fate. It was released on March 30, 2018. The album's single "Broken Heart" peaked at number 15 on the Billboard Mainstream Rock Songs chart in July 2018.

Track listing

Personnel 

Escape the Fate
 Craig Mabbitt – lead vocals
 Kevin Gruft – lead guitar, producer, programming, engineer, bass, backing vocals
 TJ Bell – rhythm guitar, backing vocals
 Robert Ortiz – drums, backing vocals

Additional musicians
 Diamante Azurra – background vocals
 Seann Bowe – background vocals
 Selah Ford – background vocals
 Meron Ryan – background vocals
 Sidnie Tipton – background vocals

Artwork and design
 Melody Myers – art direction, design, layout
 Sanjay Parikh – art direction

Production
 Howard Benson – producer, programming, arranger, keyboards
 Mike Plotnikoff – producer, arranger
 Hatsukazu "Hatch" Inagaki – engineer
 Zach Darf – assistant engineer
 Trevor Dietrich – assistant engineer
 Shaun Ezrol – assistant engineer
 Marc Vangool – guitar technician
 Jon Nicholson – drum technician
 Paul DeCarli – digital editing
 Evan Rodaniche – mixing

Charts

References 

2018 albums
Escape the Fate albums
Eleven Seven Label Group albums
Albums produced by Howard Benson